Safrudin Tahar (born 13 December 1993) is an Indonesian professional footballer who plays as a defender for Liga 1 club PSM Makassar.

Club career

PSIS Semarang 
After failed his trial on Persik Kediri, Safrudin Tahar choose PSIS Semarang as his team. He play 23 times and scored 1 goal in his first season and bring PSIS Semarang to a quarter-final, but unfortunately PSIS Semarang can not qualified to the next stage because of match fixing scandal. But Tahar escaped sanctions, so his contract was extended by PSIS Semarang. In 2017, Tahar helped the club win third-place of Liga 2 after winning 6-4 over Martapura in December 2017 and automatically promote to Liga 1.

Borneo F.C. Samarinda
In 2021, Safrudin Tahar signed a contract with Indonesian Liga 1 club Borneo Samarinda. He made his debut on 10 September 2021 in a match against Persik Kediri.

PSM Makassar
Safrudin was signed for PSM Makassar to play in Liga 1 in the 2022–23 season. He made his league debut on 29 August 2022 in a match against Persib Bandung at the Gelora B.J. Habibie Stadium, Parepare.

International career
Tahar called up Indonesia U-22 for 2013 AFC U-22 Championship qualification.

Honours

Club
PSIS Semarang
 Liga 2 third place (play-offs): 2017

References

External links
 Safrudin Tahar at Soccerway
 Safrudin Tahar at Liga Indonesia
 Safrudin Tahar at footballdatabase.eu

1993 births
Indonesian footballers
Living people
People from Ternate
Sportspeople from North Maluku
PSMS Medan players
PSM Makassar players
PSIS Semarang players
Borneo F.C. players
Liga 1 (Indonesia) players
Liga 2 (Indonesia) players
Indonesia youth international footballers
Association football defenders